The Kartellverband katholischer deutscher Studentenvereine (incorporated November 29, 1865) is a German academic corporate association with ninety member corporations in Germany, Austria and Switzerland.  As of February 2008, the Alliance represents 16,000 students in Germany alone.

History

Prior to and during the First World War, 1853—1918 
The process of forging an alliance of Catholic students' corporations began in 1863, when several couleur-wearing ones (Farbentragende katholische Studentenverbindungen) independently prepared an inter-association group under the initial title Cartellverband der katholischen deutschen Studentenverbindungen; the organization suffered schism in its first year.  In 1865,  a successful a new, non-couleur-wearing alliance under the present name was incorporated at Berlin twelve years to the day after the Katholische Leseverein was incorporated.  The initial association consisted of five non-couleur-wearing student corporations (Nichtfarbentragende katholische Studentenvereine):  the K.St.V. Askania-Burgundia Berlin, established November 29, 1853 as the Katholische Leseverein, at Humboldt-Universität, Berlin; the K.St.V. Unitas-Breslau, established March 4, 1863, at Universitas Wratislaviensis, Breslau, Lower Silesia (Wrocław, Lower Silesian Voivodeship, Poland, from 1945); the K.St.V. Arminia Bonn, established November 6, 1863, at Rheinische Friedrich-Wilhelms-Universität, Bonn, North Rhine-Westphalia; the K.St.V. Germania, established March 7, 1864, at Westfälische Wilhelms-Universität, Münster, North Rhine-Westphalia; and the K.St.V. Walhalla Würzburg, established 1864, at Julius-Maximilians-Universität, Würzburg, Franconia.

In 1865, the Kartellverband commenced its work in the intellectual, religious and cultural areas of the German society of the period.  The same year saw the Kartellverbands first major adversity:  a multilateral inquiry into the doctrine of Papal infallibility.  The Cultural Struggle, a heavy burden on its member corporations, actually served to promote the Kartellverband to the point where, as of 1914, the Kartellverband had fifty-one (51) member Student corporations.

 During the Weimar Republic, 1919—1932 
After the Peace of Versailles, the Kartellverband'''s ranks swelled with returning war veterans, resulting in the establishment of numerous additional corporations including the Katholische Österreichere Studentenvereine at Vienna and Graz, Austria.

By 1921, an Alumni Board (Philisterausschuß, lit., "Philistine outshoot") was elected after much debate within the Kartellverband, the individual Studentenvereine having established alumni's unions (Philistervereine) from 1913; the principle of federal life governed the Board.

From 1930, membership declined as a consequence of the economic crisis that started with the mass stock sell-off at the New York Stock Exchange on October 29, 1929.

 During the Nazi Regime, 1932—1945 
The Kartellverband faced a triple whammy that eventually resulted in forcible decorporation on July 6, 1938 under the Verbot der Korporationsverbände:  Misjudgment of the totalitarian regime of Adolf Hitler, misinformation and deliberate Nazi deception.

In March 1933, the Catholic bishops' resistance to the Nazi power grab weakened, and with it the will of the Studentenvereine to fight; the conclusion of the Reichskonkordat finished both off.  Several corporations resisted, but were unable to halt the Kartellverbands collapse.

At the start of the Nazi regime, the corporations, that were not prohibited, were held for enlargement of their directors' boards.  On September 1, 1933 at Frankfurt am Main, the Kartellverband was merged into the Ring katholischer deutscher Burschenschaften, despite objections from within, over the fact that a "color-carrying" and a "non-coleur-wearing" board had been combined; and from without, as the Deutsche Burschenschaft accused the RKDB of name infringement.  The merger did not last long.

On July 10, 1933, the Studentenvereine in Austria severed ties with the Alliance on account of Austro-German tensions at the time, and incorporated an Österreichischer Cartellverband; the Kartellverband katholischer nichtfarbentragender akademischer Vereinigungen Österreichs incorporated July 22 of the same year.  Both Kartellverbände were forcibly decorporated on June 20, 1938 in the wake of the Nazi invasion and annexation of Austria (Anschluß Österreiches).

 1945—present 
The Alliance was reincorporated immediately after the end of the Nazi regime.  Many Kartellverband alumni were directly involved in the fledgeling government of the Federal Republic of Germany, newly incorporated in 1946, emerging at all Minister positions and the Federal Chancellory (Bundeskanzleramt).  At the Constitutional Court (Bundesverfassungsgericht), the Kartellverband was involved in the establishment of the liberal democratic basic order
(Freiheitlich-demokratische Grundordnung), with Gebhard Müller as Chief Justice and Ernst-Wolfgang Böckenförde and Paul Kirchhof as Associate Justices.

From 1968, the Kartellverband reorganized from the ground up, the primary innovation being the capacities of the member Students' Unions, in certain cases composed of non-Catholic Christians.

The Kartellverband is a member of the Labor-Congress of Catholic Associations (Arbeitsgemeinschaft katholischer Verbände) and the Labor-Congress of Catholic Student Associations (Arbeitsgemeinschaft katholischer Studentenverbände).

 Principles 
The Kartellverband holds to the principles of:
Faith
Science
Friendship

The Kartellverband of Austria additionally holds to the principle of Love of Home-Nation.

 Member Unions 

Notable Kartellverband katholischer deutscher Studentenvereine members
Konrad Adenauer
Karl Albrecht
Walter Althammer
Bernard Altum
Willi Ankermüller
Karl Ludwig Freiherr von und zu Guttenberg
Hans-Peter Friedrich
Heinrich Held
Joseph Hergenröther
Andreas Hermes
Bruno Kurowski
Julius Leber
Wilhelm Marx
Josef Müller (CSU politician)
Friedrich Wilhelm Weber
Josef Wirmer

 Footnotes 

 Bibliography 
 (Deutsch) Akademische Monatsblätter, Official Newsletter of the KV.k.d.StVe. ISSN 0002-3000.
 (Deutsch) Robert Jauch OFM, Das Prinzip "Religion" katholischer Studenten- und Akademikerverbände unter besonderer Berücksichtigung der nachkonziliaren Entwicklung beim Kartellverband katholischer deutscher Studentenvereine (KV).  Würzburg, BRD: Archivverein e.V. der Markomannia, 1986.

 See also 
 Students' union
 German Student Corps, a "color-carrying" students' union (Farbentragende Studentenverbindung'').

External links 
 (Deutsch) Official Website of the KV.k.d.StVe, Kartellverband.de

 
Christian organisations based in Germany
Student organizations established in 1865